Jim Mitchell (born April 28, 1949) is an American underground cartoonist from Milwaukee. Mitchell was part of the late-1960s/early-1970s Milwaukee underground comix scene and a co-founder of the Krupp Comics/Kitchen Sink group (with Denis Kitchen and Don Glassford).

In the early 1970s, Mitchell (then a Marquette University student) regularly created strips such as "Smile" for the underground newspaper The Bugle, which were subsequently syndicated to other underground and college newspapers via the Krupp Syndicate.  His strips (and covers) appeared in The Bugle; in three issues of his own comic, Smile (1971-1972); and in other comix, including Teen-Age Horizons of Shangrila, Mom's Homemade Comics, Bizarre Sex, Pro Junior, and Hungry Chuck Biscuit's Comics & Stories.

Mitchell was imprisoned in Mexico for four and a half years for possession of marijuana which prevented his involvement in the further evolution of the underground scene, but was released in late 1977.

He runs his own full-service art studio, Distant Thunder Studios, in Milwaukee.

References

Sources 
A History of Underground Comics; Mark James Estren. 3rd ed. (Berkeley, CA. : Ronin, 1993)
Encyclopédie des bandes dessinées; Marjorie Alessandrini, ed. (Paris: A Michel, 1986)

External links
 Mitchell's Distant Thunder Studios homepage
 Mitchell's art in the Michigan State University Libraries Comic Art Collection

1949 births
American cartoonists
Living people
Marquette University alumni
Underground cartoonists
Artists from Milwaukee